Main group peroxides are peroxide derivatives of the main group elements.  Many compounds of the main group elements form peroxides, and a few are of commercial significance.

Examples
With thousands of tons/year being produced annually, the peroxydisulfates, are preeminent members of this class.  These salts serve as initiators for polymerization of acrylates and styrene.

At one time, peroxyborates were used in detergents.  These salts have been largely replaced by peroxycarbonates.

Many peroxides are not commercially valuable but are of academic interest.  One example is bis(trimethylsilyl) peroxide (Me3SiOOSiMe3).  Phosphorus oxides form a number of peroxides, e.g. "P2O6".

References

Peroxides